Ottoman clothing or Ottoman fashion is the style and design of clothing worn during the Ottoman Empire.

Ottoman period

While the Palace and its court dressed lavishly, the common people were only concerned with covering themselves. Starting in the reign of Suleiman the Magnificent, administrators enacted sumptuary laws upon clothing. The clothing of Muslims, Christians, Jewish communities, clergy, tradesmen, and state and military officials were particularly strictly regulated during the reign of Suleiman the Magnificent.

In this period men wore outer items such as 'mintan' (a vest or short jacket), 'zıbın', 'şalvar' (trousers), 'kuşak' (a sash), 'potur', an entari or kaftan (a long robe), 'kalpak', 'sarık' on the head; 'çarık', çizme (boots), 'çedik', 'Yemeni' on the feet. The administrators and the wealthy wore caftans with fur lining and embroidery, whereas the middle class wore 'cübbe' (a mid-length robe) and 'hırka' (a short robe or tunic), and the poor wore collarless 'cepken' or 'yelek' (vest).

Women's everyday wear was şalvar (trousers), a gömlek (chemise) that came down to the mid-calf or ankle, a short, fitted jacket called a zıbın, and a sash or belt tied at or just below the waist. For formal occasions, such as visiting friends, the woman added an entari or kaftan, a long robe that was cut like the zıbın apart from the length. Both zıbın and kaftan were buttoned to the waist, leaving the skirts open in front. Both garments also had buttons all the way to the throat but were often buttoned only to the underside of the bust, leaving the garments to gape open over the bust. All of these clothes could be brightly colored and patterned. However, when a woman left the house, she covered her clothes with a ferace, a dark, modestly cut robe that buttoned all the way to the throat. She also covered her hair and face with a pair of veils.

Headgear was the most potent indicator of male social status. While commoners wore "külah's" covered with 'abani' or 'Yemeni', higher-ranking men wore a wide variety of turbans.

'Political crises of the 17th century were reflected as chaos in clothes. The excessively luxurious compulsion of consumption and showing off in the Tulip Era lasted until the 19th century. The modernization attempts of Mahmud II in the 1830s first had its effects in the state sector. While the 'sarık' was replaced by the 'fez', the people employed in the Sublime Porte began to wear trousers, 'setre' and 'potin'.

Headwear 
Ottoman headdresses indicated the status and occupation of the wearer. Royal turbans could be decorated with feathers in an ornamental aigrette. Starting from the 19th century, sultans started wearing fezzes instead of turbans. The daughters of sultans would receive luxurious jewelry when getting married, including diadems or veils with jewels embedded in them. Imperial and noble ladies would also cover their heads with small handkerchiefs and their faces with Brussels net veils.

There are not a lot of records of women's clothing at the time, so artwork is used to gain some understanding. Headdresses were typically tall, pointed hats with a veil attached to them, which served to cover their faces during outings. In depictions of sultanas, their clothing is mostly fabricated with few references to what Ottoman women actually wore. A portrait of Roxelana depicts her wearing a pillbox-shaped headdress with decorative jewels on the border. While her headdress illustrates popular styles in Ottoman women's headwear at the time, her clothing remains very similar to European-style clothing. This was a popular way of depicting women, specifically sultanas, back then.

Many factors contributed to changes in Ottoman women's garments, including the cost of materials and firmans, or royal declarations. At the beginning of the 18th century, upper-class women began wearing yashmaks, or veils that covered their faces when going out. Over time, the yashmaks became more transparent and wider with silver embroidery. As more changes were made to women’s clothing, yashmaks and feraces were seen less as garments to cover the body and instead as decorative and ornamental styles.

In the 19th century, there were more extreme changes in women’s clothing. Yemenis, or headscarves, were so thin that their hair was almost all visible. Other traditional garments combined Turkish and European styles of fashion.

Around the time of World War I, Turkish women began wearing headscarves tied below the chin instead of the charsaf, a robe-like dress that covered the whole body and head except for the eyes.

Tanzimat period 

During the 'Tanzimat' and 'Meşrutiyet' period in the 19th century, the common people still keeping to their traditional clothing styles presented a great contrast with the administrators and the wealthy wearing 'redingot', jacket, waistcoat, boyunbağı (tie), 'mintan', sharp-pointed and high-heeled shoes.
Women's clothes of the Ottoman period were observed in the 'mansions' and Palace courts. 'Entari', 'kuşak', 'şalvar', 'başörtü', 'ferace' of the 19th century continued their existence without much change. In the 16th century, women wore two-layer long 'entari' and 'tül', velvet shawl on their heads. Their outdoor clothing consisted of 'ferace' and 'yeldirme'. The simplification in the 17th century was apparent in an inner 'entari' worn under a short-sleeved, caftan-shaped outfit and the matching accessory was a belt.

Women's wear becoming more showy and extravagant brought about adorned hair buns and tailoring. Tailoring in its real sense began in this period. The sense of women's wear primarily began in large residential centers such as Istanbul and İzmir in the 19th century and women gradually began to participate in social life, along with the westernization movement. Pera became the center of fashion and the Paris fashion was followed by the tailors of Greek and Armenian origin. In the period of Abdul Hamid II, the use of 'ferace' (a concealing outer robe shaped like a modestly cut version of the indoor dress) was replaced by 'çarşaf' of different styles. However, the rural sector continued its traditional style of clothing.

Ottoman influence on Western female dress

Interactions between Ottomans and Britons occurred throughout history, but in the 18th century, European visitors and residents in the Ottoman Empire markedly increased, and exploded in the 19th century. As such, fashion is one method to gauge the increased interactions. Historically, Europeans clothing was more delineated between male and female dress. Hose and trousers were reserved for men, and skirts were for women. Conversely, in the Ottoman Empire, the male and female dress was more similar. A common item worn by both was the şalvar, a voluminous undergarment in white fabric shaped like what is today called "harem pants". To British women traveling in the Ottoman Empire, the şalvar quickly became a symbol of freedom because they observed that Ottoman women had more rights than British women did. Lady Mary Wortley Montague (1689–1762), whose husband was the British Ambassador to Constantinople, noted in her travels in her "Embassy Letters" that Ottoman women "possessed legal property rights and protections that far surpassed the rights of Western women". These female travelers often gained an intimate view of Ottoman culture, since as women, they had easier access to the Muslim Elite harems than did men. Şalvar successfully spread into Europe at the end of the 19th century as various female suffragists and feminists used şalvar as a symbol of emancipation. Other British women of distinction, such as Lady (Janey) Archibald Campbell (1845–1923), and Lady Ottoline (Violet Anne) Morrell (1873–1938) wore şalvar "in an attempt to symbolize their refusal of traditional British standards and sexual differences". Şalvar also spread beyond Europe when Amelia Jenks Bloomer modified these "Turkish trousers" to create American "bloomers".

Another area where the Ottomans influenced female Western dress was in layering. Initially, layering had a practical use for the ancestors of the Ottoman Empire, who were pastoral nomads and horse riders, and needed to wear layers to adapt to changing temperatures. But as the Ottoman Empire came into being, the layering of garments would distinguish one's gender, class, or rank within particular communities, while also displaying many sumptuous fabrics, thus signaling one's wealth and status. Layering also had spiritual significance. For instance, in Islamic art, layering different patterns represents a spiritual metaphor of the divine order that seems to be incomprehensible, but is actually planned and meaningful.

In Europe, in the 16th century, skirts began to have a layered appearance. Previous to the 16th century, skirts were slit only at the bottom, but now, the slit bisected the front of the skirt to reveal a contrasting layer underneath. Often, the underlayer would coordinate with a layered sleeve. Hanging sleeves were also a European concept that was derived from the Ottomans, although they arrived in Europe much earlier than layered skirts. In the 12th century, religious and scholarly peoples would wear coats that had hanging sleeves, similar to Turkish-style outer kaftans. These hanging sleeves meant one could see the second layer of fabric underneath the outer layer. Although hanging sleeves had been present in Europe since the 12th century, they did not escape Lady Mary Montague's fascination in the 18th century. In a letter dated 10 March 1717, she wrote to the Countess of Marabout Hafiz (Hafsa) Sultan, a woman who was a favorite of the deposed Sultan Mustafa: "But her dress was something so surprisingly rich, that I cannot forbear describing it to you. She wore a vest called donalmá, which differs from a caftan by long sleeves and folding over the bottom. It was of purple cloth, straight to her shape, and thick-set on each side, down to her feet, and round the sleeves, with pearls of the best water, of the same size as their buttons commonly are."

Republican period
The common clothing styles prevailing in the mid 19th century imposed by religious reasons entered a transformation phase in the Republican period. In this period the 'şapka' and the following 'kılık kıyafet' reform being realized with the leadership of Mustafa Kemal Atatürk in Kastamonu in 1925 had a full impact in Istanbul. Women's 'çarşaf' and 'peçe' were replaced by a coat, scarf, and shawl. Men began to wear hats, jackets, shirts, waistcoats, ties, trousers and shoes. With the industrialization process of the 1960s, women entered the work-life and tailors were substituted by readymade clothes industry. The contemporary fashion concept, as it is in the whole world, is apparent in both social and economic dimensions in Turkey as well.

Modern use
Modern Turkish designers such as Rıfat Özbek, Cemil İpekçi, Vural Gökçaylı, Yıldırım Mayruk, Sadık Kızılağaç, Hakan Elyaban, and Bahar Korçan draw inspiration from historical Ottoman designs, and Ottoman or Ottoman-inspired patterns are important to the Turkish textile industry.

Gallery
Religious garb (1878)

Everyday people (1878)

Folk costumes in 1873
 Vilayet of Constantinople

 Vilayet of Adrianople

 Vilayet of the Danube

 Vilayet of Prizren; Vilayet of Scutari

 Vilayet of Janina; Vilayet of Salonica; Vilayet of Bosnia

 Vilayet of Crete

 Vilayet of the Archipelago

 Vilayet of Hudavendigar

 Vilayet of Aydın

 Vilayet of Konia

 Vilayet of Ankara

 Vilayet of Kastamonu

 Vilayet of Sivas

 Vilayet of Trebizond

 Vilayet of Erzerum

 Vilayet of Diyarbekir

 Vilayet of Adana; Vilayet of Aleppo

 Vilayet of Syria

 Vilayets of Baghdad; Hejaz; Yemen; Tripolitania

See also

 Kaftan
 Calpack
 Fez
 Jelick
 Turkish salvar
 Harem pants
 Bloomers
 Turban
 Yashmak
 Dolman
 Çarşaf
 Delia (clothing)
 Kontusz
 Pas kontuszowy
 Żupan
 Towel
 Timeline of the Turks (500–1300)

Notes

References 
 
 
 .
 
 .

External links
  NYPL Digital Gallery — Album of Turkish Costume Paintings

 
History of Asian clothing
Folk costumes